Yuzvendra Chahal (born 23 July 1990) is an Indian international cricketer who plays for the Indian cricket team in white ball cricket as a leg spin bowler. He plays for Haryana in domestic cricket and Rajasthan Royals in the Indian Premier League. He is a Right-arm leg break bowler. Chahal was the second player and first Indian to take a 6 wicket haul in T20I history. He was the first concussion substitute to be named man of the match in an international cricket match. He is a former chess player and represented India internationally in chess.

Domestic career 
Chahal was first signed up by Mumbai Indians in 2011. He appeared in only 1 IPL game across three season and that was against Kolkata Knight Riders on 24 April but played in all matches in the 2011 Champions League Twenty20. He took 2 for 9 in 3 overs in the Final against Royal Challengers Bangalore, helping Mumbai defend the total of 139 and lift the title. At the 2014 IPL players auction, he was bought by the Royal Challengers for his base price of  10 lakh. He got the Man of the Match award against Delhi Daredevils in IPL 2014.

In January 2018, he was bought back by the Royal Challengers Bangalore in the 2018 IPL auction. In February 2022, he was bought by the Rajasthan Royals in the Mega auction for the 2022 Indian Premier League tournament. On 18 April 2022, in the IPL match against the Kolkata Knight Riders, Chahal took a hat-trick and a five-wicket haul.

International career 
He was named in the 14-man squad to tour Zimbabwe in 2016. He made his One Day International (ODI) debut against Zimbabwe at Harare Sports Club on 11 June 2016, Richmond Mutumbami was his first wicket in ODIs.

In the second match, Chahal took three wickets for just 26 runs and led his side to victory by 8 wickets. In his second over, he delivered a seam-up delivery at a speed of 109 km/h. His bowling performance earned him first international man of the match award as well.

He made his Twenty20 International (T20I) debut against Zimbabwe at Harare on 18 June 2016, Malcolm Waller was his first wicket in T20Is.

On 1 February 2017, he became the first bowler for India to take a five wicket haul in T20Is, ending with figures of 6/25 against England.
Yuzvendra Chahal was also the first legspinner to pick up a fifer as well as 6 wicket haul in a T20I and had the record for the best bowling as a legspinner in T20I history (6/25).

He took the most wickets (23) in T20Is in 2017 by any bowler. Chahal is also the first Indian bowler to claim a five-wicket haul in T20Is in the third T20 against England on February 1, 2017.

On 18 January 2019, Chahal took his 2nd One Day International 5 wicket haul by taking 6/42 against Australia. These were the joint best figures by an Indian bowler vs Aussies after Ajit Agarkar in 2003/04. These also were best figures by an Indian spinner at MCG in Australia against Australia. In this match, Australia scored 230 in 48.5 overs while India chased it easily by winning it from 7 wickets courtesy fine knocks from M.S. Dhoni, Kedar Jadhav.

In April 2019, he was named in India's squad for the 2019 Cricket World Cup. He ended his world cup campaign with 12 wickets. In November 2019, during the third T20I against Bangladesh, he became the third bowler for India to take 50 wickets in T20Is.

On 4 December 2020, in the first T20I match against Australia, Chahal replaced Ravindra Jadeja as a suffering a concussion. Chahal was later named the man of the match, becoming the first concussion substitute to win the man of the match award in an international cricket fixture.
In June 2021, he was named in India's One Day International (ODI) squad for their series against Sri Lanka.

He was left out of the Indian 2021 T20 WC squad, prompting several questions and reactions.

In February 2022, in the opening match against the West Indies, Chahal took his 100th wicket in ODI cricket.

In June 2022, Chahal was named in India's squad for their T20I series against Ireland.

Chess career 
Chahal is the only player to represent India in both chess and cricket. He represented India in chess at the World Youth Chess Championship, though he gave up the game later when he struggled to find a sponsor. He is listed in World Chess Federation's official site, as per latest FIDE ratings, Chahal's rating is 1956.

Personal life 
Yuzvendra Chahal got engaged to Dhanashree Verma, a YouTuber, dance choreographer and dentist on 8 August 2020 and married her on 22 December 2020 in Gurgaon in a private ceremony.

In 2022, he revealed that during his stint with the Mumbai Indians, a drunk teammate dangled him from a 15th floor balcony. He did not name the player, but this revelation led to calls for strict action. Earlier, he had also been tied up in a room by Andrew Symonds and James Franklin.

Honours

 Indian Premier League runner up 2022

References

External links 
 
 

1990 births
Living people
People from Jind
Indian cricketers
India One Day International cricketers
India Twenty20 International cricketers
Haryana cricketers
Royal Challengers Bangalore cricketers
Mumbai Indians cricketers
Cricketers from Haryana
Cricketers at the 2019 Cricket World Cup
Rajasthan Royals cricketers